Cape Lisburne (Iñupiaq: Uivvaq) is a cape located at the northwest point of the Lisburne Peninsula on the Chukchi Sea coast in Alaska. It is a part of the Chukchi Sea unit of Alaska Maritime National Wildlife Refuge.

History 
The first European to sight this cape was James Cook. He named it on August 21, 1778, and wrote: "The southern extreme seemed to form a point which was named Cape Lisburne."

An early Inupiaq name for the cape was "Uivvaq," generally spelled "Wevok" or "Wevuk". Cape Lisburne was often referred to as "Uivaq Ungasiktoq" meaning "distant cape" as opposed to "Uivaq Qanitoq" (Cape Thompson) meaning "near cape."

The native Inupiaq who lived there were struck by a deadly epidemic and many died along with an Episcopal missionary named John Driggs. 

From 1951 to 1983, the United States Air Force maintained a long-range radar and communication facility at Cape Lisburne Air Force Station that was part of the DEW Line network of radar sites along the Alaska North Slope. The Pacific Air Forces Regional Support Center maintains the radar installation today.

References

External links

Lisburne
Landforms of North Slope Borough, Alaska
Alaska Maritime National Wildlife Refuge
Protected areas of North Slope Borough, Alaska